Picture Perfect is the fifth studio album by American rock band SOiL, released on October 20, 2009. It was produced by Johnny K, Ulrich Wild, and SOiL, with Dave Fortman handling mixing duties. Picture Perfect is the final album to feature vocalist A.J. Cavalier, with Ryan McCombs making his return to the band in late 2011. Two singles were released from the album, "Like It Is" and "The Lesser Man".

Track listing

Personnel
 A.J. Cavalier – lead vocals
 Adam Zadel – lead guitar, backing vocals
 Tim King – bass, backing vocals
 Tom Schofield – drums

References 

2009 albums
Soil (American band) albums
AFM Records albums
Bieler Bros. Records albums
Albums produced by Johnny K